Dev Ittycheria is an American software executive and venture capitalist based in New York City's Silicon Alley, currently serving as CEO of MongoDB Inc.

Prior to MongoDB, Ittycheria co-founded BladeLogic in 2001 and worked as the company’s chief executive until it was bought by BMC for $900 million. In 2012, he became a partner at venture capital firm Greylock Partners.

References

American technology chief executives
Living people
Year of birth missing (living people)